Huaidi, Huai Di, Emperor Huai, or the Huai Emperor may refer to:

 Huai of Xia (Chinese: , Huái), a semilegendary monarch of the Xia Dynasty
 Emperor Huai of Jin China (Huái), an early 4th-century monarch